William A. Fagan  (February 15, 1869 – March 21, 1930), nicknamed "Clinkers", was an American baseball player who played for the New York Metropolitans and the Kansas City Cowboys from 1887 to 1888 .

External links

1869 births
1930 deaths
Major League Baseball pitchers
New York Metropolitans players
Kansas City Cowboys players
19th-century baseball players
Albany Senators players
Lynn Lions players
Troy Trojans (minor league) players
Denver Grizzlies (baseball) players
Denver Mountaineers players
Des Moines Prohibitionists players
Omaha Omahogs players
Omaha Lambs players
Rochester Flour Cities players
Harrisburg Ponies players
Scranton Indians players
Lebanon Pretzel Eaters players
Baseball players from New York (state)
Burials at St. Agnes Cemetery